Grégoire François Du Rietz (1607, Arras - 5 February 1682, Maria Magdalena church, Stockholm) was a French physician. He served as personal physician to queen Christina of Sweden, Carl X Gustav of Sweden, Hedvig Eleonora of Holstein-Gottorp and Carl XI of Sweden. He was naturalised as a Swedish subject in 1660 and was thus the originator of the Swedish Du Rietz dynasty.

1607 births
1682 deaths
17th-century French physicians
People from Arras
French emigrants to Sweden
17th-century Swiss physicians